Cyanistes  is a genus of birds in the tit family Paridae. The genus was at one time considered as a subgenus of Parus. In 2005 an article describing a molecular phylogenetic study that had examined mitochondrial DNA sequences from members of the tit family, proposed that a number of subgenera including Cyanistes be elevated to genus status. This proposal was accepted by the International Ornithologists' Union and the British Ornithologists' Union.

Species
The genus contains three species:

The name Cyanistes was introduced for a subgenus by the German naturalist Jakob Kaup in 1829. The word comes from the classical Greek kuanos meaning dark-blue. The type species was designated as the Eurasian blue tit by George Gray in 1842.

References

 
Bird genera